Paul Fry is the William Lampson Professor of English at Yale University, a specialist in British Romantic poetry.

He received his BA from the University of California, Berkeley and his Ph.D. from Harvard University.

Major publications
Wordsworth and the Poetry of What We Are Yale University, 2008
The Poet's Calling in the English Ode Yale University Press, 1980
Melville Cane Award of the Poetry Society in America.
Reviews, in British Journal of Aesthetics 1981 21(2):178-180;
The Reach of Criticism: Method and Perception in Literary Theory Yale University Press, 1984,
William Empson: Prophet Against Sacrifice Routledge, 1990
A Defense of Poetry: Essays on the Occasion of Writing  Stanford Univ Press, 1996
Review: by Kolb, Jack in Philosophy and Literature - Volume 20, Number 2, October 1996, pp. 522–524
(edited), "The Rime of the Ancient Mariner"  Bedford-St. Martins, 1999
"Ezra Stiles's Idea of a University" Journal of Aesthetic Education, Vol. 36, No. 3 (Autumn, 2002), pp. 4–8
 
At Yale, he was master of Ezra Stiles College from 1995 to 2002.

References

External links
Paul Fry's Profile at Yale University
 In 2009, Professor Fry delivered a semester-long course on the Theory of Literature, which can be viewed here and here.

University of California, Berkeley alumni
Harvard University alumni
American academics of English literature
Yale University faculty
Living people
Year of birth missing (living people)